Stranske Makole is a settlement on the left bank of the Dravinja River in the Municipality of Makole in northeastern Slovenia. The area is part of the traditional region of Styria and is now included with the rest of the municipality in the Drava Statistical Region.

References

External links
Stranske Makole at Geopedia

Populated places in the Municipality of Makole